Oswald Van Ooteghem (14 August 1924 – 1 November 2022) was a Belgian politician.

A member of the People's Union, he served in the Senate from 1974 to 1987 and in the Flemish Council from 1980 to 1987.

Van Ooteghem died in Gentbrugge on 1 November 2022, at the age of 98.

References

1924 births
2022 deaths
20th-century Belgian politicians
Members of the Senate (Belgium)
Members of the Flemish Parliament
People's Union (Belgium) politicians
Politicians from Ghent